Under The Canopy of Love (Traditional Chinese: 天幕下的戀人) is a TVB modern drama series broadcast in February 2006.

Due to the success of the series, a related series retaining the original cast was created, known as The Seventh Day (最美麗的第七天), which was broadcast in 2008.

Synopsis
Because of a lost PDA, the lovely and childlike Fiona Ko Yat-Sze (Niki Chow) is brought together with her Prince Charming, a boy whom she had had a crush on since school days. Alan Shum Long (Kevin Cheng) is the Prince Charming, who, after graduation from school, lost touch with Sze. Their encounter takes place in a shopping mall, which is designed like a canopy.

Alan meets Nick Kuen Lik (Bosco Wong), a Taekwondo black belt who starts working as a security guard at the mall Alan works at. Nick develops deep respect for Alan and takes the initiative to acknowledge him as "big brother". The simple and honest Nick initially likes Sze's sister, who is a bit of a gold digger, but later falls for Sze. Meanwhile, another woman (Claire Yiu) falls for Long...

Later on, Nick is discovered to be the long lost son of the rich owner of the mall.

Cast

Viewership ratings

Awards and nominations

Awards
39th TVB Anniversary Awards (2006)
 "Best Actor in a Leading Role" (Kevin Cheng - Alan Shum Long)

Nominations
39th TVB Anniversary Awards (2006)
 Nominated - "Best Drama"
 Nominated - "Best Actor in a Leading Role" (Kevin Cheng - Alan Shum Long)
 Nominated - "Best Actor in a Leading Role" (Bosco Wong - Nick Kuen Lik)
 Nominated - "Best Actress in a Leading Role" (Niki Chow - Fiona Ko Yat-Sze)
 Nominated - "Best Actor in a Supporting Role" (Ha Yu - David Ko Pak-Fai)
 Nominated - "Best Actress in a Supporting Role" (Natalie Tong - CoCo Ko Yat-Ching)
 Nominated - "Best Actress in a Supporting Role" (Yvonne Ho - Chris Ko Yat-Nam)
 Nominated - "My Favourite Male Character Role" (Kevin Cheng - Alan Shum Long)
 Nominated - "My Favourite Male Character Role" (Bosco Wong - Nick Kuen Lik)
 Nominated - "My Favourite Female Character Role" (Niki Chow - Fiona Ko Yat-Sze)

Trivia
 The opening theme of the drama can be seen in episode 7 of 2013's Reality Check, another TVB production.

References

External links
TVB.com Under the Canopy of Love - Official Website 
TVBSquare.com Under the Canopy of Love - Review 

TVB dramas
2006 Hong Kong television series debuts
2006 Hong Kong television series endings